Creed Cardwell Burlingame (February 27, 1905 – October 21, 1985) was a Rear Admiral in the United States Navy. He served as a submarine commander in the Pacific Theater during World War II.

Early life
Burlingame was born in Louisville, Kentucky, on February 27, 1905 and grew up in the Midwest.

Naval career
In June 1927, Burlingame graduated from the United States Naval Academy as an ensign and served aboard the battleship . He subsequently graduated from the Submarine School in New London, Connecticut, in 1930. He served as a submarine officer in service with the Asiatic fleet, and served aboard one of the few United States submarines stationed at the China station.

After the Japanese attack on Pearl Harbor, Burlingame was immediately transferred to the USS Silversides for its commissioning at Mare Island, California on 15 December 1941. It was his sixth submarine and third command. After a brief shakedown off the California coast, he sailed Silversides for Hawaii, arriving at Pearl Harbor on 4 April 1942 and left for his first combat patrol on 30 April. He was promoted to commander on 10 September. Burlingame commanded Silversides for a total of five patrols, sinking eight enemy ships for a total 44,000 tons. While commanding the Silversides, the ship and crew received a presidential citation and Burlingame earned two Silver Stars and three Navy Crosses. As commander of the 182d Submarine Division in the Pacific, he was awarded the Legion of Merit.

Awards and decorations

Navy Cross citations

First

Second

Third

Silver Star citations

First

Second

Legion of Merit citation

References

1905 births
1985 deaths
United States Navy personnel of World War II
Burials at Arlington National Cemetery
Recipients of the Legion of Merit
Recipients of the Navy Cross (United States)
Recipients of the Silver Star
United States Navy rear admirals (lower half)
United States submarine commanders
Military personnel from Louisville, Kentucky